Alf Beus (born 2 May 1954) is a former Australian rules footballer who played for the South Melbourne Football Club in the Victorian Football League (VFL).

Notes

External links 

Living people
1954 births
Australian rules footballers from Victoria (Australia)
Sydney Swans players